Great Doddington is a village and civil parish in Northamptonshire in the United Kingdom, close to Wellingborough and just off the A45. At the time of the 2001 census, the parish's population was 1,061 increasing to 1,123 at the 2011 census.

The name Dodda's Tun probably refers to an Anglo-Saxon leader 'Dodda' establishing a stronghold in the strategic position overlooking the Nene Valley. Domesday Book records the principal landowner as Judith, widow of Waltheof II, Earl of Northumbria.

The Church of England St Nicholas Church dates back to Norman days and has a square tower and four 15th century misericords. The village contains a village shop, and two churches, St Nicholas' and a United Reformed Chapel.

The civil parish contains two wards.

References

External links

The village's official website
The Parish Church's official website
Great Doddington Photos Great Doddington Flickr photo pool
Great Doddington Primary School

Villages in Northamptonshire
North Northamptonshire
Civil parishes in Northamptonshire